Xavier Hunault (29 January 1923 – 16 January 2021) was a French politician. He was the father of politicians Michel Hunault and Alain Hunault.

References

1923 births
2021 deaths